David Alexander Elder (29 April 1865 at Melbourne, Victoria, Australia – 22 April 1954 at Deepdene, Victoria) was a cricket Test match umpire.

Career as umpire
He umpired twelve Test matches, all between Australia and England.  He made his debut in the match played at Melbourne on 30 December 1911 to 3 January 1912, won by England by 8 wickets.  All Elder's other matches were after the First World War.  His last match was played at Adelaide on 1 February to 8 February 1929, won narrowly by England in spite of Archie Jackson's 164 on debut.  His colleagues were Bob Crockett and George Hele.

Johnnie Moyes thought that, after Crockett...

Personal life
Off the field, Elder was a brassworker.  He was married twice and had one son.  He died of heart failure, aged 88.

See also
 Australian Test Cricket Umpires
 List of Test umpires

External links
 

1865 births
1954 deaths
Australian Test cricket umpires